is the collective nickname for the Chūō Line of the  Osaka Metro and the Keihanna Line of the Kintetsu Railway in Osaka Prefecture and Nara Prefecture, Japan. The two lines operate through trains between Cosmosquare Station, the western terminus of the Chūō Line in Suminoe-ku, Osaka, and Gakken Nara-Tomigaoka Station, the eastern terminus of the Keihanna Line in Nara.

History 
The name and a logotype was published on October 26, 2005 as a result of public contest.
The use of the name started on March 27, 2006 when the Kintetsu Higashi-Osaka Line was extended to Gakken Nara-Tomigaoka Station and renamed the Keihanna Line.

Etymology 
The term "Yumehanna" can be broken into "Yume" and "Hanna"; "Yume" means dream in Japanese and "Hanna" (阪奈) is a kanji abbreviation for Osaka (大阪) and Nara (奈良).

The committee for the name selection explained the reason for the victory of the name as follows: "It successfully expresses the hope for the future of the connection of the Science City and the Osaka Bay Area. Also, the use of hiragana creates the soft nuance of the word and a friendly image."

References 

Osaka Metro
Lines of Kintetsu Railway